Kaiji may refer to:

People
, Japanese manga artist whose works include Eagle and Zipang
, Japanese voice actor; see List of Ultraman manga characters
 Kaiji Tang, (born 1984) an American voice actor
, Japanese ceramist of the Showa era; see Celadon

Characters
, a character from the manga and anime series Kaiji
, a character also known as Damon Gant from the video game series Ace Attorney

Other uses
 Kaiji (train), a train service in Japan
 Kaiji (manga), a Japanese manga and anime series

See also
 Kaji (disambiguation)

Japanese masculine given names